TkDesk was a graphical file manager for the X Window System used by Unix and Unix-like systems, which has seen its last update in 2004.

It is highly configurable since it is based upon Tcl and Tk.

TkDesk is released under the GNU GPL.

References

External links
  TkDesk homepage

Free file managers
Free software programmed in Tcl
Software that uses Tk (software)